Gusti Ngurah Made Pemecutan (died 1810) was a King in Badung who created the province of Badung and conquered Jembrana in the late 18th century.

External links 
 About Badung  - Bali Sawadee

1810 deaths
Indonesian Hindu monarchs
Balinese people
Year of birth unknown
18th-century Indonesian people
19th-century Indonesian people